The number of newspapers in Albania was nearly 92 in 2001 and 98 in 2002.

Below is a list of newspapers in Albania.

Albanian language

ABC
Agon
Albania
 Bashkimi
 Bujuka
 Ekonomia
 Gazeta e pavarur
Fjala e Tokësorit
 Flaka e Vëllazërimit
Festival
Gazeta 55
Gazeta Shqiptare
Gazeta Sot
Gazeta Telegraf
Insajderi
Koha Jonë
Kombetare
 Korrieri
Libertas
Lunxhëria
Mesazhieri
Metropol
Panorama
Reporteri
Rilindja Demokratike
Rimëkëmbja
Shekulli
Shqip
Shqiperia Online
Shqiptarja.com
Gazeta Sportive
Sporti shqiptar
Standard
Tema
Zëri i Popullit
Gazeta Ballkan
Gazeta Mapo
Gazeta Dita
Gazeta e pavarur
Gazeta Sport Ekspres
Gazeta Telegraf
Gazeta Shendeti
Gazeta Intervista
Gazeta Celesi|Gazeta Celesi]]

Online news portals
Albanian Daily  www.albaniandaily.com 
https://argjirolajm.net/
www.shqip.com
https://argjirolajm.net/
www.balkanweb.com 
www.syri.net 
www.reporter.al
www.respublica.al
www.lapsi.al 
www.lajme.al
www.lajmifundit.al
www.reporteri.al
www.telegrafi.com
 Gazeta e pavarur www.epavarur.com 
www.javanews.al
www.albeu.com 
www.cna.al 
www.newsbomb.al 
www.dritare.net 
www.24-ore.com 
www.360grade.al 
www.eduasportin.com
www.gazetaexpress.com
www.boldnews.al
www.droni.al
www.gazetasportive.al

English language
Albanian Mail
NOA
Tirana Times
Albania Daily news

Greek language
Dimotiki Foni
Dris
Foni tis Omonoias
Laiko Vima
Provoli
Romiosini

Multilingual
 Gazeta 2000 (Greek, Albanian, English)
 Gazette.al - Shqipëri Gazette (English, Albanian)

See also
 List of magazines in Albania
 List of Web Portals in Albania

References

 
Albania
Newspapers